ADP-ribose 1′′-phosphate phosphatase (EC 3.1.3.84, POA1, Appr1p phosphatase, Poa1p) is an enzyme with systematic name ADP-D-ribose 1′′-phosphate phosphohydrolase. This enzyme catalyses the following chemical reaction

 ADP-D-ribose 1′′-phosphate + H2O  ADP-D-ribose + phosphate

The enzyme is highly specific for ADP-ribose 1′′-phosphate.

References

External links 
 

EC 3.1.3